Zirku Island is an island in the Persian Gulf about  northwest of the city of Abu Dhabi and belongs to the United Arab Emirates.

Until 1978, Zirku was a refuge for cormorants and other birds until the Zakum Development Company began development for oil processing. Today there are oil refining facilities, a petroleum terminal and an airport on the island. More recently, ZADCO has commissioned studies to study biodiversity on the island. According to a report from August 2015, more than 1000 people live and work on the island. Zirku has no own freshwater resources and was therefore never naturally inhabited.

See also
 Sir Abu Nuʽayr

References

Islands of the United Arab Emirates